Shirley Holms Halt was a railway halt in the New Forest district of Hampshire. Opened in 1860 it was closed in 1888 with opening of Sway on the South West Main Line. Said to be one of the first halts in the country, Shirley Holms Halt consisted of a short unstaffed platform. Passengers from the halt had to signal to the engine driver if they wanted to board the train.

References

Disused railway stations in Hampshire
Former London and South Western Railway stations
Railway stations in Great Britain opened in 1860
Railway stations in Great Britain closed in 1888